The Samsung Galaxy Buds 2 were announced on August 11, 2021 at Galaxy Unpacked alongside the Galaxy Watch 4. The Buds 2 were seen as the successor to the Buds Plus, which were discontinued following the announcement. The Buds 2 include active noise cancellation, and cost less than the Buds Pro, and were praised for their all around performance for the price.

Specifications

References 

Samsung Galaxy
Samsung wearable devices